Storylords is a 1984 low-budget live-action instructional television series shown on educational and PBS member stations in the United States, often during instructional television blocks. It was produced at the University of Wisconsin–Stout for the Wisconsin Educational Communications Board.

General summary

Storylords consists of twelve 15-minute programs which focus on building reading comprehension strategies through the use of fantasy.  The storyline consists of a young boy named Norbert who has been apprenticed by Lexor – an old Storylord from the land of Mojuste – to defend Mojuste's citizens against the wicked Storylord, Thorzuul.  Thorzuul seeks to turn all of those who can't understand what they read into stone statues for his collection. 

The first few episodes follow a basic formula: first, Norbert is summoned by Lexor through a magic ring to enter the land of Mojuste and help a certain citizen solve a riddle or word puzzle given by Thorzuul.  He then travels to Mojuste via the "Bike-o-Tron" (a magical stationary exercise bike in his garage), while chanting:
       

In Mojuste, Norbert meets with Thorzuul's potential victim.  By recalling a recent lesson from his teacher, Mrs. Framish, he helps the citizen solve the riddle just in time before Thorzuul arrives on his motorcycle (driven by his chauffeur, Milkbreath) and discovers that his plans have been thwarted.

About halfway through the series, Norbert's sister, Mandy, becomes curious about her brother's secret life and decides to follow him to the garage.  She touches him, just as he is traveling to Mojuste on the Bike-o-Tron and is transported to the land with him, later to become his assistant.

In the last four episodes, Thorzuul decides to stop targeting Mojuste's citizens and instead uses his schemes against Norbert and Mandy themselves.

There is an exhibit features original costumes, props and photographs, as well as interactive experiences. This exhibit is at the Rassbach Museum in Menomonie, WI. Check out a 1980's classroom, and hop on the Bike-O-Tron to be transported to the magical land of Mojuste. Learn about the making of the show, and all of the magical places in Dunn County that were featured in the show. Rassbach Museum Storylords exhibit

Main cast
 Colm O'Reilly—Norbert
 Tanya Tiffany—Mandy
 Mike Nelms—Jason
 Karin Worthley—Mrs Framish
 Alexis Lauren—Lexor
 Larry Laird—Thorzuul
 Dennis Fenichel—Milkbreath

Production Credits
 Producer/Director -  Ed Jakober
 Writer - Jed MacKay
 Program Development - Tom DeRose
 Production Manager - Tim Fuhrmann
 Music Written and performed by: Dave Roll
 Art Director - Annette Proehl
 Audio - Larry Roeming, Jim Guenther
 Production Engineers - Ron Heinecke, Pat Allickson
 Studio Manager - Louis Rivard
 Production Assistants - Bill Moran, Paul Hed

Episodes
 Activating Prior Knowledge Before Reading
 Connecting What You Know With What's On The Page
 Knowing When You Don't Know (In Your Head)
 Knowing When You Don't Know (On The Page)
 Directed Reading-Thinking Activity
 Question-Answer Relationships
 Decoding Words in Context
 Inferring Word Meaning in Context
 Story Mapping
 Pronoun Anaphora
 Identifying Main Idea and Details
 Integrating Comprehension Strategies

Criticism
Storylords has been criticized by a conservative educator for its emphasis on the whole language method of learning reading skills, rather than through the use of phonics. 

Phyllis Schlafly commented on her political activism website, the  Eagle Forum, that the series tells kids to "skip over" words they can't pronounce, and instead try to figure out their meanings through pictures or context clues.  She concluded that, "With these mischievous instructions, children will never be able to read books unless there are pictures on every page."

American children's education television series
American children's fantasy television series
Reading and literacy television series
1980s American children's television series
1984 American television series debuts
1984 American television series endings